Alessandro Longhi (12 June 1733 – November 1813) was a Venetian portrait painter and printmaker in etching (mostly reproductions of paintings). He is known best for his oil portraits of Venetian nobles of state. His father was the famed genre painter Pietro Longhi. He trained under his father and Giuseppe Nogari (1699–1763). Like Sebastiano Bombelli in the prior century, Alessandro Longhi is noted for his zealous full-length depictions of robes and emblems of office.  His "tumultuous and unusual (etching) technique shows first-hand knowledge of Rembrandt's etchings", according to Olimpia Theodoli.

Works
Luigi and Alvise III Pisani and family
Portrait of Carlo Goldoni
Portrait of a Composer, erroneously to be the Portrait of Domenico Cimarosa
Portrait of a Lady
Portrait of a Gentleman
Portrait of a Gentleman
 Portrait of Bartholomeo Ferracino Ca' Rezzonico Venice
Couple 1 of 2
Couple 2 of 2
Portrait of Giambattista Piazzetta
Portrait of Giuseppe Chiribiri (Cherubini)
Portrait of Giulio Contarini
Portrait of Giacomo Casanova
Portrait of Antonio Renier
Portrait of a Magistrate
Painting and Merit
The Visitation of the Virgin in Sant'Antonio Taumaturgo, Trieste

Gallery

References

External links
Italian Paintings, Venetian School, a collection catalog containing information about Longhi and his works (see index; plate 44).

1733 births
1813 deaths
18th-century Italian painters
Italian male painters
19th-century Italian painters
Italian engravers
Italian portrait painters
Painters from Venice
19th-century Italian male artists
18th-century Italian male artists